Paris pour un beefsteak is a song written during and about the siege of Paris (1870–71), on 15 October 1870, by Émile Deureux, in Blanqui's journal La Patrie en danger using the music of Te souviens-tu ? (fr).

References 

Songs based on actual events
Songs about Paris
1870 songs